Babna Gora is a settlement in the Municipality of Šmarje pri Jelšah in eastern Slovenia. It lies in the hills south of Šmarje in the Kozje region. The area is part of the traditional region of Styria. The municipality is now included in the Savinja Statistical Region.

The local church is dedicated to Saint Anne and belongs to the Parish of Sveti Štefan pri Žusmu. It was first mentioned in written documents dating to 1490. It was rebuilt at the beginning of the 18th century.

References

External links

Babna Gora at Geopedia

Populated places in the Municipality of Šmarje pri Jelšah